Charles John Caborn (born 1856) was a football player who played for Nottingham Forest. He was educated at Nottingham High School.

Caborn played for Nottingham Castle FC and captained them from 1876. He moved to Forest when the Castle club disbanded in 1878.

Caborn was a back for Nottingham Forest and made 32 FA Cup appearances as well as in many friendly games. There was no league in these seasons. He appeared in the first known photograph of Nottingham Forest for the season 1878-79.

His first known appearance was on 14 October 1878 in a friendly against Stoke and made his competitive debut in Forest's first-ever FA Cup 1st Round against Notts County.

He played in the Nottingham Forest side that are the only English team to play an FA Cup Semi-Final in Scotland when they played Queens Park in Edinburgh in the 1885.

References 

Nottingham Forest F.C. players
Footballers from Nottingham
English footballers
People educated at Nottingham High School
Association football defenders
1856 births
Year of death missing